The Orchestra of St. Luke's (OSL) is an American chamber orchestra based in New York City, formed in 1974.

Orchestra of St. Luke’s presents over 70 concerts, programs, and events in a variety of diverse musical genres every season, including an annual Carnegie Hall Orchestra Series, Chamber Music Series, Bach Festival, Free Community Concerts serving all five boroughs, Free School Concerts that reach over 11,000 public school children, and an annual Composition Institute dedicated to the fostering of compositional talent and creation of new work for chamber orchestra. OSL puts classical music performances and training within reach for all New Yorkers through its Education & Community programs, and provides rehearsal, recording, education, and performance space through The DiMenna Center for Classical Music, its home in New York City's Hell's Kitchen neighborhood.

The orchestra performs at several venues in New York City, including, Carnegie Hall, Caramoor Center for Music and the Arts, Saint Thomas Church (Manhattan), Congregation Emanu-El of New York, and Merkin Concert Hall.

Orchestra of St. Luke's is the orchestra for Paul Taylor Dance Company.

The orchestra owns and operates the DiMenna Center for Classical Music, and is located (alongside Baryshnikov Arts Center) at 450 West 37th Street in Manhattan's Hell's Kitchen neighborhood.

History
The core of the orchestra is the St. Luke's Chamber Ensemble, which was founded in 1974 as an ensemble of 21 to 22 musicians. It is named for the Church of St. Luke in the Fields, Greenwich Village, in Manhattan, where the ensemble first performed. Michael Feldman, a music teacher in Manhattan, was the first de facto conductor of the ensemble. The larger Orchestra of St. Luke's was formally founded in the summer of 1979 at the Caramoor International Music Festival in Katonah, New York, as the festival's resident orchestra.

In the 1984/85 season, Carnegie Hall invited the orchestra to perform as part of a Handel Opera Festival, conducted by Charles Mackerras, Raymond Leppard, and John Nelson, and which featured performers including Marilyn Horne, June Anderson, Tatiana Troyanos and Kathleen Battle. In the 1986/87 season Carnegie Hall began presenting the orchestra in an annual subscription series, which continues to this day.

The organization of the orchestra's musicians falls into a three-tier roster, with the second tier of 20 players utilized for chamber orchestra concerts, and the third tier of 20 to 30 musicians for use in concerts that require larger ensembles. The pool of musicians for the orchestra generally derives from freelance New York City musicians. The orchestra musicians themselves decide on the hiring and dismissal, and assignments, of the players, without a central music director.

The orchestra's first titled conductor was Roger Norrington, the music director from 1990 to 1994. Sir Charles Mackerras was the orchestra's second music director, from 1998 to 2001, but with limited administrative work and only for the designated 3-year period, per his request. Donald Runnicles was the orchestra's next titled conductor, with the title of principal conductor, from 2001 to 2007. In December 2011, the orchestra announced the appointment of its current principal conductor, Pablo Heras-Casado, with immediate effect, and with an initial contract through 2015 and an extension through September 2017. Heras-Casado concluded his principal conductorship of the orchestra at the close of the 2018–2019 season, and subsequently took the title of conductor laureate, the first conductor to be named to this titled post with the orchestra.

In May 2014, Orchestra of Saint Luke's, with the Choral Arts Society of Washington and the Krakow Philharmonic Choir, under the direction of Sir Gilbert Levine, made its public television concert debut performing at DAR Constitution Hall in Washington D.C. The concert, titled A Celebration of Peace Through Music aired on PBS stations  throughout North America and in Europe via the European Broadcasting Union (EBU).  A CD and DVD of the concert were released by Delos and Kino Lorber, respectively.

In May 2017, the orchestra announced the appointment of Bernard Labadie as its next principal conductor, effective with the 2018–2019 season.  The appointment was unusual in that Labadie had not conducted the orchestra prior to his appointment.  His conducting debut with the orchestra was in July 2017.  In March 2022, the orchestra announced the extension of Labadie's contract as principal conductor through the 2024-2025 season.

The orchestra announced a Bach Festival in June 2019, as well as the first edition in July 2019 of an annual Composition Institute. Composer Anna Clyne has served as the Mentor Composer for the Composition Institute since its inception in 2019.

Orchestra of St. Luke's has premiered more than 100 orchestral and chamber works by such composers as John Adams, Joan Tower, Gabriela Lena Frank, Valerie Coleman, Anthony Davis, Nicholas Maw, André Previn, George Tsontakis, Bryce Dessner, Ellen Taaffe Zwilich and Alma Deutscher. The orchestra has appeared on more than 100 recordings, four of which have won Grammy Awards: John Adams's Nixon in China, Samuel Barber's Knoxville: Summer of 1915, Listen to the Storyteller with Wynton Marsalis, and Bel Canto with Renée Fleming. In 2003, the orchestra launched its own record label, St. Luke's Collection.

The orchestra's current president and executive director is James Roe. Its current board chairman is Norman S. Benzaquen.

Music directors and principal conductors
 Roger Norrington (1990–1994; music director)
 Sir Charles Mackerras (1998–2001; music director)
 Donald Runnicles (2001–2007; principal conductor)
 Pablo Heras-Casado (2011–2017; principal conductor)
 Bernard Labadie (2017–present; principal conductor)

See also
 A Carnegie Hall Christmas Concert
 The Rossini Bicentennial Birthday Gala

References

External links

Chamber orchestras
Musical groups established in 1974
Orchestras based in New York City
1974 establishments in New York City